Raku may refer to:

 Lake Raku, an artificial lake in Tallinn, Estonia
 Raku ware, a type of pottery used in the Japanese tea ceremony
 Raku, Nepal,  a village in the Karnali Zone
 RAkU (ballet), a ballet by Yuri Possokhov
 Raku (programming language), a computer language formerly known as Perl 6

See also
 Horse hair raku, a method of decorating pottery
 Raku-Go, a form of Japanese verbal entertainment